Jorge Gallardo (December 12, 1924 – April 4, 2002) was a Costa Rican painter and poet.

Gallardo's works are among the most important art collections of the Government of Costa Rica as well as many individuals, both domestic and foreign. His art is an irreverent mix in which he uses an impeccable use of color, which many have considered flat and without complexities. He painted many colorful pictures displaying topics such as agriculture in Costa Rica and the working people on landscapes.

Gallardo spent a great deal of time in Europe which is reflected in his artistic style. Jorge Gallardo, called his art "Christian Realism" and published in 1968, "Art for Charity". He was noted poet and some of his writings include "La Justicia Divina" (1968); "Dar, Amanecer del Amor"(Poetry, 1974); "La Celestina Intelectualoide" (Short novel, 1975); "La Guerra Intrauterina"(Short novel, 1975); "La Pedagogía Diabólica" (Short novel, 1978).

Jorge Gallardo arrived in Europe in the aftermath of World War II. He befriended people as Octavio Paz, Gabriela Mistral, Giovanni Papini, Alfonso Paso and numerous others which helped him visualize his mission as a painter: defining his country of birth, Costa Rica, in pictorial language. 

He died in 2002.

References
This article was initially translated from the Spanish Wikipedia.

Costa Rican painters
20th-century Costa Rican poets
Costa Rican male poets
1924 births
2002 deaths
20th-century Costa Rican painters
20th-century male writers